Amalia Ioana Coldea is a Romanian quantum physicist who is an Associate Professor at the University of Oxford. She was awarded the 2019 Institute of Physics Brian Pippard Prize and the 2011 EuroMagnet Prize.

Early life and education 
Coldea was born in Transylvania, Romania. She completed her undergraduate studies in the Babeș-Bolyai University, Cluj-Napoca. She was a doctoral student at the University of Oxford. As a graduate student she was based at The Queen's College. She was involved with various strategic committees focused on accessing high magnetic fields across Europe. Her doctoral research considered manganites that exhibit colossal magnetoresistance. After completing her doctorate, she was appointed a postdoctoral research fellow.

Research and career 
Coldea started her independent career at the University of Bristol in 2005. She was awarded a Royal Society Dorothy Hodgkin Fellowship. She returned to the University of Oxford in 2010. At Oxford, Coldea is part of the Centre for Applied Superconductivity. She was awarded an Engineering and Physical Sciences Research Council Career Acceleration Fellowship. Her early work considers topological insulators, novel materials with strong spin-orbit coupling. Such materials are insulators in the bulk but have protected metallic surfaces, on which electrons cannot backscatter and outstanding transport mobilities are observed. In an effort to realise high performance next-generation devices, Coldea makes use of nanoscale tools to study topological insulators in low dimensional nanostructures. 

Coldea leads research in quantum materials at the University of Oxford. She is particularly interested in superconductivity, a state of matter in which conduction electrons become correlated with one another and electrical resistance vanishes.  She monitors quantum oscillations directly at the Fermi surface of these superconductors, as well as studying metallic systems. Her research has focussed on unconventional semiconductors based on iron. Superconductivity is a surprising observation in iron, as its strong ferromagnetism was expected to destroy any coherent electronic state. It has been proposed that superconductivity originates from nematic electronic states. These states break rotational symmetry, which gives rise to a distorted Fermi surfaces and anisotropic transport properties. She is interested in the use of high magnetic fields (up to 21 T) and cryogenic temperatures (down to 50 mK) to identify and study novel phases within quantum materials. 

In 2019, Coldea was awarded the Institute of Physics Brian Pippard Prize.

Selected publications

Personal life 
Coldea has two children.

References 

Living people
Year of birth missing (living people)
People from Transylvania
Babeș-Bolyai University alumni
Fellows of Somerville College, Oxford
Quantum physicists
21st-century women scientists